The Castellany of Gützkow was a castellany in the Duchy of Pomerania in the High Middle Ages. It was established before 1128 from the Principality of Gützkow, following its conquest by Pomerania. In 1229, following the death of its castellan, Wartislaw I, it was reorganized into the County of Gützkow.

History 
Until the 12th century, the area centred around the burgh of Gützkow was controlled by the Principality of Gützkow, inhabited by the Lutici tribe. By the time when Otto of Bamberg had converted the area into Christianity, the state was already conquered by the Duchy of Pomerania and reorganized into Castellany of Gützkow. Its castellan was Wartislaw I, duke of Pomerania. Following his death in 1129, the castellany was reorganised into the County of Gützkow, with Wartislaw's daughter, Dobroslawa of Pomerania, being titled the Countess of Gützkow.

Notes

Bibliography 

Wächter, Joachim: Zur Geschichte der Besiedlung des mittleren Peeneraums. In: Beiträge zur Geschichte Vorpommerns: die Demminer Kolloquien 1985–1994. Thomas Helms Verlag, Schwerin 1997,  
Wächter, Joachim: Das Fürstentum Rügen - Ein Überblick. In: Beiträge zur Geschichte Vorpommerns: die Demminer Kolloquien 1985–1994. Thomas Helms Verlag, Schwerin 1997,  
Wöller, Werner: Vor- und Frühgeschichte, Mittelalter und frühe Neuzeit. In: Ortsgeschichtskommission Gützkow beim Rat der Stadt Gützkow (publ.): Heimatgeschichte von Gützkow und Umgebung. Heft 2/1990, pp. 4–23 

History of Pomerania
Duchy of Pomerania
11th century in Europe
Former states and territories of Mecklenburg-Western Pomerania
States and territories established in the 1120s
States and territories disestablished in 1129